In modern Russian political terminology, the non-system opposition or non-systemic opposition are oppositional forces which operate outside of the official political establishment. Alternatively, the systemic opposition operates in the form of registered political parties.

There are two major reasons of the existence of the non-system opposition. First, the Russian Law on Political Parties was setting a high threshold for a political party to be registered for the participation in elections, the highest hurdle being the requirement to have at least 45,000 members. Second, a number of activists, such as Garry Kasparov and Vladimir Bukovsky, are in principle against registration, saying that the registration itself is de facto a "vassal oath of allegiance to the authorities".

The emergence of the "non-system" political activities (and the introduction of the term) followed the  2003 Duma elections notable for the new extremely restrictive law about political parties. The period of 2004–2012 witnessed waves of mass political actions organized by the opposition movements.  The spectrum of political views of the non-system opposition is extremely broad, and attempts to create "suprapolitical" associations, such as The Other Russia, eventually failed.

According to a paper by Ivan Bol'shakov, the term "non-systemic opposition" reflects neither ideological distance to the ruling party nor non-acceptance of democratic institutions. The non-systemic opposition refers to opposition parties that are ‘excluded’ from the political system because they lack both a representation in the structures of state power and contacts with the ruling group. They predominantly use unconventional methods of political struggle, have limited resources, are particularly active on social networks, and enjoy little trust among citizens.

In 2012, Ivan Tyutrin and Aleksandr Lukyanov of the Solidarnost movement wrote that the nonsystem/system dichotomy, i.e. based on a formal criterion, became outdated; the real dichotomy should be whether a political force is non-conformist or conformist with respect to Putinist political system. Their arguments are: radicalization of some "systemic opposition", decreased importance of registration during non-election time, expected alleviation of hurdles for registration by Dmitry Medvedev's reforms, and efforts of the current establishment to introduce discord into opposition.

See also
Extra-parliamentary opposition

References

Further reading
КОЗОДОЙ ВИКТОР ИВАНОВИЧ, "СТАНОВЛЕНИЕ ПОЛИТИЧЕСКОЙ ОППОЗИЦИИ В РОССИИ: ИСТОРИЧЕСКИЙ ОПЫТ" ("Formation of the Political Opposition in Russia: Historical Perspective"), Известия Российского государственного педагогического университета им. А.И. Герцена, no. 57, 2008, pp. 199–204
МЕДВЕДЕВ Н.П., БОРИСЕНКО А.В., "НЕСИСТЕМНАЯ ОППОЗИЦИЯ В ПОЛИТИЧЕСКОМ ПРОСТРАНСТВЕ СОВРЕМЕННОЙ РОССИИ" ("Non-System Opposition in the Political Space of Modern Russia"), Научные ведомости Белгородского государственного университета. Серия: История. Политология. Экономика. Информатика, no 8, vol. 4, 2007, pp. 150–155

Opposition to Vladimir Putin
Politics of Russia
Russian democracy movements
Political opposition